Sponaugle is a surname.

List of people with the surname 

 Isaac Sponaugle (born 1979), American politician
 S. Woodrow Sponaugle (1915–1967), American football and basketball coach

See also 

 Sponaugle–Williamson Field

Surnames
Surnames of North American origin